Zhu Xiao Di (born  1958) is a Chinese-American writer. He authored a biographical work, Thirty Years in a Red House: A Memoir of Childhood and Youth in Communist China, which was listed for further readings in MSN encyclopedia under the topic of "Communism" along with a few other books.

Background
Born in 1958 in Nanjing, China, Zhu Xiao Di is a graduate of MIT with a master's degree in City Planning (1991). He also received a master's degree in American Civilization from the University of Massachusetts Boston in 1989.

Between 1992 and 1997, he worked at the Center for Survey Research at the University of Massachusetts Boston. He also worked for Arthur Andersen & Co. as a management consultant between 1995 and 1996. He worked at the Joint Center for Housing Studies at Harvard University between 1997 and 2012.

Publications

Thirty Years in a Red House  (University of Massachusetts Press, 1998)
Tales of Judge Dee (stories about Judge Dee)
Leisure Thoughts on Idle Books (Guangxi Normal University Press, 2009)
《地老天荒读书闲》
《闲读近乎勇》
《朱小蔓朱小棣跨洋对话——出国留学与教育“立人”》
《等闲识得书几卷》
《朱启銮画传》
《游学看美国》
《域外闲读》
《闲读闲记》

References

1958 births
Living people
MIT School of Architecture and Planning alumni
Harvard University staff
Writers from Nanjing
American writers of Chinese descent
Chinese male novelists